Bashir Ali Salad (Bashir Bililiqo) was a somali colonel in the Somali National Army and the founder of the Somali Patriotic Movement.

Career
His birth name was Bashir Ali Salad.

References

1992 deaths
20th-century Somalian people
Somalian politicians